Taeniolethrinops cyrtonotus is a species of cichlid endemic to Lake Malawi over areas with sandy substrates at depths of from .  This species can reach a length of  TL.

References

cyrtonotus
Taxa named by Ethelwynn Trewavas
Fish described in 1931
Taxonomy articles created by Polbot